The 2010–11 Maltese First Division (also known as 2010–11 BOV 1st Division due to sponsorship reasons) began on 23 October 2010 and ended on 1 May 2011.

Due to a in-season change regarding the league system, the third-placed team of this season will be promoted to the Maltese Premier League, along with the regular two promotees.

Teams
These teams will contest the 2010–11 season:
 Balzan Youths
 Dingli Swallows
 Lija Athletic
 Melita
 Mosta
 Mqabba
 Msida Saint-Joseph
 Pietà Hotspurs
 St. Andrews
 St. George's

Changes from previous season
 Marsaxlokk and Vittoriosa Stars were promoted to the Premier League. They were replaced with Dingli Swallows and Msida Saint-Joseph, both relegated from 2009–10 Maltese Premier League
 St. Patrick and last-placed San Gwann were relegated to the 2010–11 Maltese Second Division. They were replaced with Lija Athletic and St. Andrews.

League table

Results

Top scorers

References

Maltese First Division seasons
Malta
2